"Why Does It Always Rain on Me?" is a song by Scottish band Travis, released as the third single from their second studio album, The Man Who. The song became the group's international breakthrough single, receiving recognition around the world. Following a rain-soaked performance at the 1999 Glastonbury Festival, the song became Travis's first top-10 hit on the UK Singles Chart, peaking at  10 in August 1999. The song also peaked within the top 20 in Australia and achieved moderate success in mainland Europe, North America, Ireland, and New Zealand. In a poll by listeners of Absolute Radio, the song was ranked 62nd on a list of the top 100 songs of the 1990s.

Background
Fran Healy started writing the song while on holiday in Eilat, Israel. According to Healy, he was looking for some winter sun when his accountant suggested Eilat, which is known for its hot weather even during winter time. However, on the way to the hotel, it began to rain, which lasted until he left a week later.

Healy said he wanted to write the song, and wrote the second verse starting with "Why does it always rain on you? Is it because I picked you up in '92?" but decided that it wasn't good and changed it. He said that the line "Is it because I lied when I was 17?" refers to the time when he lied about his age to get a job behind the bar at the biggest club in Glasgow. The rest of the song was written six months later in Madrid at 1 o'clock in morning. He had just spoken to his manager on the phone who assured him that his career is taking off, but he felt things were not working for him, and wrote the lines "I can't sleep tonight / Everybody's saying everything is alright" and "I can't stand myself" which refers to him hating himself as well as not being able to stand up. "I'm being held up by invisible men" refers to people in the music industry who propped him up as well as holding him up like robbers.

Music video
The music video was directed by John Hardwick and filmed in Cornwall, with scenes filmed on Bodmin Moor. The pool of water that Healy (actually a stuntman) jumps into is part of a disused mining quarry known locally as "Gold Diggings" in Craddock Moor which is on the edge of Bodmin Moor. The video features the band in a rain-soaked setting, with the band having locked frontman Healy, wearing a kilt, in the trunk of a 1970s Vauxhall Viva. Healy escapes, and chases the rest of the band into a disused mining quarry. The video continues with the band being shown in a floating living room, performing the song. The video ends with the living room floating away. It does not actually rain at any point during the video.

The underwater scenes were filmed by underwater cinematographer Mark Silk, in the tank at Oceanic SW Limited, Honiton, Devon. (The company went into administration in January 2019). The director of photography of the video was Ben Davis with Derrin Schlesinger the producer.

Live performances
When Travis began to perform this song at the 1999 Glastonbury Festival, after being sunny for several hours, it began to rain exactly when the first line was sung, and stopped at the end of the song. Their performance was a talking point of the festival, and their career took off afterwards. Their single was released a month after Glastonbury, and it reached No. 10 on the UK Singles Chart; it also helped push the album The Man Who to No. 1.

Despite the performance's reputation, Healy was at the time disappointed in the band's performance, believing they had blown their opportunity with an average showing. "I can't hear myself. I'm out of tune. Oh no, it just started raining and everyone's really upset at me," Healy recalled thinking. Lead guitarist Andy Dunlop said, "People looked miserable and it was raining. It wasn't really one of the things that you felt, 'Oh, this is history!" However, the day after, the band saw Jo Whiley and John Peel on television name Travis the performance of the weekend.

Track listings

UK CD1
 "Why Does It Always Rain on Me?"
 "Village Man"
 "Driftwood" (live at the Link Café, Glasgow)

UK CD2
 "Why Does It Always Rain on Me?"
 "The Urge for Going"
 "Slide Show" (live at the Link Café, Glasgow)

UK cassette single
 "Why Does It Always Rain on Me?"
 "Village Man"

European maxi-CD single
 "Why Does It Always Rain on Me?"
 "Village Man"
 "Driftwood" (live at the Link Café, Glasgow)
 "The Urge for Going"

Australian and New Zealand maxi-CD single
 "Why Does It Always Rain on Me?" – 4:25
 "Village Man" – 3:18
 "Driftwood" (live at the Link Café, Glasgow) – 4:06
 "...Baby One More Time" (live at the Bay Tavern, Robin Hood's Bay) – 3:30
 Multimedia

Japanese EP
 "Why Does It Always Rain on Me?"
 "Village Man"
 "Driftwood" (live at the Link Café, Glasgow)
 "The Urge for Going"
 "Slide Show" (live at the Link Café, Glasgow)

Credits and personnel
Credits are lifted from the UK CD1 liner notes.

Studios
 Produced at Chateau de la Rouge Motte (Domfront en Poiraie, France) and Abbey Road (London, England)
 Mixed at Mayfair Studios (London, England)

Personnel

 Fran Healy – writing
 Sarah Wilson – cello
 Mike Hedges – production
 Ian Grimble – co-production
 Nigel Godrich – mixing
 Blue Source – art direction
 Stefan Ruiz – photography

Charts

Weekly charts

Year-end charts

Certifications

Release history

References

1999 singles
1999 songs
Epic Records singles
Independiente (record label) singles
Song recordings produced by Mike Hedges
Songs about suicide
Songs written by Fran Healy (musician)
Travis (band) songs